The Grouping of Rural and Independent Chadians (GIRT) was a political party in Chad.

History
The party was founded in 1956, when the Gontchomé Sahoulba-led faction broke away from Chadian Social Action. The party mainly represented interests of traditional chiefs from southern Chad.

The party was part of the Entente alliance for the 1957 Territorial Assembly elections, alongside the Chadian Progressive Party (PPT). The Entente won 57 of the 65 seats, of which GIRT took nine. However, the party left the Entente and joined the Chadian Socialist Union, a bloc of anti-PPT parties. Later this group evolved into the African National Party (PNA). The former GIRT leader Djibrine Kerallah became the vice chair of the PNA.

References

Defunct political parties in Chad
Political parties established in 1956
1956 establishments in Chad